General Pigot may refer to:

Sir George Pigot, 3rd Baronet (1766–1840), British Army brevet major general
Henry Pigot (1750–1840), British Army general
Sir Robert Pigot, 2nd Baronet (1720–1796), British Army lieutenant general

See also
Anthony Pigott (1944–2020), British Army lieutenant general